Chris van Eeden (born 17 December 1956) is a West German sprint canoer who competed in the mid-1970s. He finished ninth in the K-4 1000 m event at the 1976 Summer Olympics in Montreal.

References
Sports-Reference.com profile

External links

1956 births
Canoeists at the 1976 Summer Olympics
German male canoeists
Living people
Olympic canoeists of West Germany
Place of birth missing (living people)